Pervomaysky is a rural locality (a settlement) in Tambovsky Selsoviet, Romanovsky District, Altai Krai, Russia. The population was 40 as of 2013. There are 3 streets.

Geography 
Pervomaysky is located 38 km northwest of Romanovo (the district's administrative centre) by road. Zavyalovo is the nearest rural locality.

References 

Rural localities in Romanovsky District, Altai Krai